The 1980 Southern Cross Rally, officially the Southern Cross International Rally was the fifteenth and final running of the Southern Cross Rally. The rally took place between the 18th and the 22nd of October 1980. The event covered 2,616 kilometres from Sydney to Port Macquarie. It was won by Ross Dunkerton and Jeff Beaumont, driving a Datsun Stanza.

Results

References

Rally competitions in Australia
Southern Cross Rally
1980 in Australian motorsport